Assa-Zag is a province in the Moroccan economic region of Guelmim-Oued Noun. Its population in 2004 was 43,535. 

The major cities and towns are: 
 Assa
 Zag

Subdivisions
The province is divided administratively into the following:

References

 
Assa-Zag Province